Wiyarra is a rural locality in the Southern Downs Region, Queensland, Australia.

History 
The locality takes its name from a former railway station, an Aboriginal word for a local lagoon with black swans.

References 

Southern Downs Region
Localities in Queensland